The Condor League is a secondary school athletic conference that is affiliated with the CIF Southern Section. The members are preparatory schools located along the Central Coast of California.  For the 2019 season, Laguna Blanca and Providence do not appear to be fielding any teams.

References

CIF Southern Section leagues
Sports in Santa Barbara County, California
Sports in Ventura County, California